Holiday: A Soldier Is Never Off Duty is a 2014 Indian Hindi-language action thriller film  written and directed by A. R. Murugadoss, starring Akshay Kumar as an army officer. It also stars Sonakshi Sinha, Freddy Daruwala,  Sumeet Raghavan and Govinda in a special appearance. It is an official remake of Murugadoss' own 2012 Tamil film Thuppakki and follows an Indian Army officer who arrives in Mumbai on vacation and sets out to hunt down the terrorist leader of a sleeper cell network and deactivate the sleeper cells operating under his command.

Kumar revealed that the story was signed by his Hari Om Entertainment after listening the first action sequence of the film by Murugadoss even before the script was fully written. He let Murugadoss to make the film in Tamil due to his dates issues, which later became Thuppakki. Although film's production commenced in 2013 with the working title of Pistol under the banner of Hari Om Entertainment and Sunshine Pictures.

The film was released worldwide on 6 June 2014.

At Filmfare Award, Kumar was nominated for Best Actor.

Plot 
Virat Bakshi (Akshay Kumar), Captain in DIA, a secret wing of Indian Army, returns to his home in Mumbai on a holiday. On his arrival, his parents rush him to see Saiba Thapar (Sonakshi Sinha), who they wanted him to marry. But Virat rejects her with an excuse that she is old fashioned and not his type. On the contrary, Saiba is a professional boxer, and is completely modern in her outlook. Virat notices her in a boxing match and falls in love with her instantly.

One day, while travelling in a bus with his friend, Sub-Inspector Mukund "Makhiya" Deshmukh (Sumeet Raghavan), Virat, while chasing a man who he regards with suspicion when he tries to flee the scene of a check going on after a passenger reports his wallet as stolen, witnesses a bomb explosion killing innocent people. Virat manages to capture the man, Ajmal Lateef, who he realizes is a terrorist and has planted the bomb, but he escapes from the hospital with the help of a police mole. Virat kidnaps Ajmal again, interrogates him to ascertain the name of the police mole and also forces the police mole, corrupt ACP Ashok Gaikwad (Gireesh Sahedev) to commit suicide. He later discovers while examining contents in Ajmal's bag that a terrorist group has planned serial blasts in Mumbai to be executed in a couple of days with the help of 12 sleeper agents, including Ajmal himself. Virat remembers that on the day when the bombs are going to be planted, there is a wedding where his team member Joel (Randheer Rai) is tying the knot, and all his Army officer friends are going to assemble. Along with his fellow Army officers and Mukund, Virat manages to track these bombers, Ajmal included, and kills them before they could trigger the bombs.

When the leader of these sleeper cells, Shadab Ali Farooqui (Freddy Daruwala), whose brother, Afsar Ali, was also one of the sleeper bombers, finds out about the team of officers involved in the failure of the terrorist attack, he goes to Joel's house and kills his family and finds an album which has photos of team officers. He targets one officer's female relative from each team and kidnaps them. When Virat realises the plan, he substitutes one of the girls to be kidnapped, with his younger sister Preeti (Cherry Mardia). Using his pet dog Rocky and his sister Pinky's (Apoorva Arora) dupatta, he manages to reach the terrorists' hideout. He eliminates all the terrorists and rescues all the victims, including Preeti, who was about to be killed after Virat's bluff was exposed. Virat also captures Asif Ali (Dipendra Sharma), who was the leader of the group but later kills him on realising that Asif is just the second-in-command of the sleeper cells.

When this tactic fails, Shadab decides to target the primary assailant himself. He kills Kapil and his family, he being one of the army officers, through a blast, and forces Virat, who he discovers is the man responsible for Afsar's death, to surrender. Virat decides to sacrifice his life and plans a suicide attack by instructing Mukund and his fellow officer Joel to follow him via a tracking chip inserted in his arm and plant a bomb at the terrorists' hideout. Virat then drives to a port in various cars, as instructed by Shadab and ends up on a ship full of terrorists. To his shock, Virat finds out that the cars he was asked to drive had bombs in them, which will frame him and his team as terrorists and also boost their plans to recruit sleeper cells in the Indian Army with the help of the Joint Defense Secretary of India Mr. Alvin D'Souza (Zakir Hussain), who is also a member of this terrorist group. Meanwhile, Joel, who was in touch with Mukund as instructed by Virat, plants a bomb at the base of the ship. By this time, Virat realises he must get out alive, but during the one-on-one fight with Shadab, his shoulder is dislocated. However, he is able to pop it back into place and escapes with Shadab, holding him alive at gunpoint, on a boat before the ship explodes, also later shooting down Shadab. The film ends with Virat forcing Alvin D'Souza to commit suicide and later returning to guard the border along with his team.

Cast

 Akshay Kumar as Virat Bakshi, Captain in DIA (a wing of Indian Army) and a soldier
 Sonakshi Sinha as Saiba Thapar, a boxer and later Virat's girlfriend
Govinda in as Major Pratap Panikar, Virat's senior commanding officer
Freddy Daruwala as Shadab Ali Farooqui, leader of the sleeper cells
 Sumeet Raghavan as Mukund 'Makhiya' Deshmukh, Virat's friend and a Sub-Inspector in Mumbai Police
 Zakir Hussain as Alvin D'Souza, Joint Secretary of Defense
 Randheer Rai as Joel Singh, A groom and a soldier
 Gireesh Sahdev in a cameo appearance as ACP Ashok Gaikwad
 Dipendra Sharma in a cameo appearance as Asif Ali, the second-in-command of the sleeper cells
 Maroof Raza in a special appearance
 Cherry Mardia as Preeti Bakshi, Virat's younger sister
 Apoorva Arora as Pinky Bakshi, Virat's youngest sister
 Indira Krishnan as Mrs. Thapar, Saiba's mother
 Prayas Mann as Afsar Ali, Shadab's brother and a sleeper cell
 Aarti Nagpal
 Athar Siddiqui as Army Officer
 Sourav Chakraborty
 Abhay Shukla
 Chirag Sethi as Siddharth, an Army officer

Production
The film's production commenced in 2013 with the working title of Pistol under the banner of Hari Om Entertainment and Sunshine Pictures. The songs are composed by Pritam Chakraborty, while the background score is composed by Prasad Sashte. The stunt coordinator of the film is Greg Powell.

The production budget of Holiday is around  without Akshay Kumar remuneration, print and advertising costs.
According to the director A. R. Murugadoss, Akshay's role is that of an Army officer for which Akshay lost some weight to fit in the role and to look 12 years younger from his real biological age. Kumar also sported a crew-cut hairstyle for his role.
Whilst Sonakshi will play the role of boxer and Virat (Kumar's) love interest Saiba.
Model and debutant Freddy Daruwala will play the main antagonist pitted against Kumar.

The film was originally scheduled for a release in early May 2014, which would have clashed with the release of Action Jackson. However, Action Jackson was pushed to December 2014.

Soundtrack

The film's soundtrack album composed by Pritam, was released on 12 May 2014. Additional songs featured in the audio CD were composed by Kaushik Dutta, were released on 2 June 2014. The lyrics were written by Irshad Kamil for the songs featured in the film. Sukumar Dutta wrote the lyrics for Kaushik Dutta's composition. Prasad Sashte composed the background score of the film. A reprise version of the song "Ashq Na Ho" was released on 17 March 2016. The Reprise version was sung by singer Asees Kaur.

Track listing

Reception

Critical response
The film has received positive reviews from the critics. ABP News similarly rated it 4.5/5, calling it a"fast-paced, exhilarating roller coaster ride" Taran Adarsh gave 4/5 and states that it is a slick action-thriller that keeps you engrossed, enthralled and captivated all through, thanks to its fascinating premise and a watertight, razor-sharp screenplay.

The Times of India gave the film 3.5 ratings describing it as This one applauds the jawans who live in the jaws of death, and is a 'wake up' call for all the 'sleepers' that abound. Bravo!"" Rachel Saltz of The New York Times stated that "The action sequences mostly have tension and punch, even if the movie is old-school long – 2 hours 41 minutes – and the plot doesn't bear too much scrutiny". The romantic angle of the film was criticised by some. Hindustan Times praised the performance of Akshay Kumar. Rajeev Masand of CNN-IBN gave 2 stars out of 5, commenting "That this film is still not as awful as most typical Akshay Kumar starrers, despite several such harebrained sequences, is to the credit of director AR Murgadoss, who doesn't let something as insignificant as common sense come in the way of telling a convenient story. In Holiday, Murgadoss remakes his own Tamil hit Thuppaki and he doesn't tinker with the blueprint at all."

Filmfare critic praised the film as a "Genuinely smart action thriller". Raja Sen of Rediff gave the film 1.5 out of 5 stars and said, "Holiday takes obscene amounts of time getting to the point."

Box office

The film has a worldwide gross collection of  against a budget of 500 million. Hence, it was a box office success.

References

External links
 

2014 films
Hindi remakes of Tamil films
2010s Hindi-language films
2014 action thriller films
Indian action thriller films
Films directed by AR Murugadoss
Hari Om Entertainment films
Films featuring songs by Pritam
Fictional portrayals of the Maharashtra Police
Films about military personnel
Indian Army in films
Reliance Entertainment films